Jon Eley (born 19 August 1984 in Solihull) is a British short track speed skater who competed at the 2006 Winter Olympics, the 2010 Winter Olympics and the 2014 Winter Olympics. Eley finished fifth in the 500 metres in Torino, and was a member of the British team that finished sixth in the 5000 metre relay in Vancouver.

Eley was part of the British 5,000m relay team that broke the world record in February 2011.

On 6 February 2014 it was announced that Eley would be the flagbearer for the Great Britain team at the 2014 Winter Olympics in Sochi, Russia. After retiring, he took up a role as Performance & Talent Manager for British Ice Skating.

External links
Jon Eley at ISU

References 

1984 births
Living people
British male short track speed skaters
Olympic short track speed skaters of Great Britain
Short track speed skaters at the 2006 Winter Olympics
Short track speed skaters at the 2010 Winter Olympics
Short track speed skaters at the 2014 Winter Olympics
Sportspeople from Solihull